Hypercompe indecisa is a moth of the family Erebidae first described by Francis Walker in 1855. It is found in Argentina and Uruguay.

Larvae have been recorded feeding on Beta, Brassica, Citrus, Cucurbita, Datura, Diospyros, Fragaria, Hippeastrum, Leucanthemum, Persea, Pisum, Prunus, Ricinus, Rosa, Senecio, Solanum, Spiraea and Zea species.

References

Hypercompe
Moths described in 1855